Meteor Stadium is a multi-purpose stadium in Dnipro, Ukraine. It is part of the Sports Complex Meteor and is a home of the Olympic and Paralympic teams of Ukraine with status national.

Overview
It is used for various Olympic sports and football matches, and for quite some time was the home of FC Dnipro. The stadium can hold 24,381 people. It has lighting 1,200 lux.

The main city club FC Dnipro relocated to Dnipro Stadium (which was built in place of the old Metalurh Stadium) after a long spell at the Meteor in 1966-2008.

The stadium also has athletics tracks, a badminton hall with four courts, a wrestling hall, three tennis courts and two weightlifting rooms.

History
The first football match was played on 30 August 1966 against Shinnik Yaroslavl which Dnipro won 3:1.

On 15 October 1981, a major tragedy took place after a game of the 1981 Soviet Top League between Dnipro and Spartak Moscow, after which 11 people died during a mass exit from the stadium.

Games of the Ukraine national football team

References

External links
 http://gorod.dp.ua/photo/usergorod/2008/10/20/20962.JPG
 Official website
 Main stadiums of Dnipro. Forum of Dnipro preservation.

1966 establishments in Ukraine
Sport in Dnipro
Football venues in Dnipropetrovsk Oblast
Multi-purpose stadiums in Ukraine
Buildings and structures in Dnipro
Athletics (track and field) venues in the Soviet Union
Football venues in the Soviet Union
Athletics (track and field) venues in Ukraine
FC Dnipro
Sports venues in Dnipropetrovsk Oblast